Musafir is a 1957 Hindi film directed by Hrishikesh Mukherjee, being his directorial debut. The screenplay and story were written by Hrishikesh Mukherjee and Ritwik Ghatak respectively. The film is about a house and the lives of three families who live in it, so in essence, it is three stories linked by the house. The first part stars Suchitra Sen in lead role. The second part stars Kishore Kumar, Nirupa Roy, Nazir Hussain in lead roles. The third part stars Dilip Kumar, Usha Kiran in lead roles. The film was a profitable venture for Hrishikesh Mukherjee.

Plot

Episode-1-Marriage 

For any young married couple, moving into their new house is a very special feeling. The feeling gets more special if the young couple has eloped and married. Something similar happened with Shakuntala (Suchitra Sen) and her husband Ajay (Shekhar). The landlord Mahadev Chaudhary (David) helps the couple move to the rented house. The young couple move to this house, which, incidentally is the main protagonist of the film. While Shakuntala makes the house into a beautiful home, her husband gets busy with work. She meets the neighbouring tea vendor (Mohan Choti) and meets the next door "aunty", whose favourite pastime is to gossip about developments in others' homes. The couple hears the sound of a violin in the night and ask the tea-stall owner about it in the morning. He says that it is being played by a madman, Pagla Babu. Since the couple had eloped, Shakuntala wanted that her parents-in-law accept her as their daughter-in-law. This is what happens, and her in-laws somehow find the young couple and they are more than happy to meet Shakuntala. Finally, Shakuntala and her husband go with them and vacate the house. In between, Shakuntala plants some seeds in the garden.

The landlord again puts the TO LET sign on the house.

Episode-2-Birth 

The next tenants in the house is a family headed by an old man Madhav (Nazir Hussain). The other members are his elder widowed daughter-in-law (Nirupa Roy) and younger college going son Bhanu (Kishore Kumar). The daughter-in-law is pregnant and we are told that her husband had just died. Bhanu is finishing his college and simultaneously looking for a job, whereas his old father is somehow managing the expenses. Although there is sadness in the home, Bhanu, with his wit and humour, maintains a light atmosphere for his sister-in-law. The next door "aunty" again comes and chats on and on. Bhanu also hears the violin and when asks about it from the tea-vendor is told about Pagla Babu. The problems of the family increase as Bhanu fails to get a job landing the family in dire consequences. He gets frustrated and this leads to a clash with his father. On feeling humiliated, Bhanu finally drinks poison before sleeping. However, the poison is adulterated and Bhanu wakes up when the entire family is mourning. He gets the news that he has finally got a job in some other city. The pregnant lady also delivers a child. The family is happy and they move to another city vacating the house. We see that the seed which Shakuntala sowed has germinated.

The landlord again puts the TO LET sign on the house.

Note: This part of the movie is adorned with a lovely song by Kishore Kumar; "Munna Bada Pyara, Ammi Ka Dulara".

Episode-3-Death 

The next inhabitants are a barrister and his widowed sister Uma (Usha Kiran). Uma has a small handicapped son Raja (Daisy Irani). The neighbourhood "aunty" again visits the home. Like the previous tenants, this family also hears the sound of a violin in the night. The child is also attracted by the music and when he finds out about Pagla Babu from the tea-vendor, he insists on meeting him. However, the vendor tells the child that Pagla babu does not meet anyone. However, the child does not listen and insists on meeting the mysterious violinist. Pagla Babu does appear to meet the child. Uma is shocked to realize that Pagla Babu is none other than Raja (Dilip Kumar), her ex-lover. Raja, however, does not make it evident and interacts fondly with the child. In a very short span, an amazing bond is developed between Raja and the child. Initially, Uma is very uncomfortable with this bonding, but slowly she accepts it. We come to know that Raja is suffering from cancer and the dreaded disease is in its advanced stages. Ironically, Raja, who is on the verge of dying, pumps life into the child and fills his dark world with hope. He also tells the child that he will start walking once there is a flower in the garden. On knowing about Raja, Uma's brother is furious. There is a clash between them. Slowly, Raja reaches the final stage and Uma takes care of him. Eventually he dies and the child starts walking. Meanwhile, in the garden, the germinated seed finally blossoms into a flower.

Cast
Dilip Kumar as Raja
Kishore Kumar as Bhanu
Suchitra Sen as Shakuntala Verma
Nirupa Roy as Bhanu's Sister-In-Law
Usha Kiran as Uma
Daisy Irani as Raja
Shekhar as Ajay Sharma
Naaz as Munni
Mohan Choti as Mohan Choti
David as Mahadev Chaudhary
Nazir Hussain as Madhav
Bipin Gupta as Neelambar Sharma 
Durga Khote as Mrs. Neelambar Sharma
Rashid Khan as Doctor
Rajlaxmi as Munni's Mother
Paul Mahindra as Advocate Suresh Chandra
Heera Sawant as Street Dancer
Keshto Mukherjee as Street Dancer

Music
All lyrics are written by Shailendra; all music is composed by Salil Chowdhury.

Awards 
 National Film Awards
 1957 - Certificate of Merit for Third Best Feature Film in Hindi

References

External links 
 

1957 films
1950s Hindi-language films
Films scored by Salil Chowdhury
Films directed by Hrishikesh Mukherjee
1957 directorial debut films